NYC Man is a 2-CD anthology of Lou Reed's work. All songs of this career spanning collection were chosen, sequenced and remastered by Lou Reed himself.

Cover art: painting from Marie Pittroff

Track listing

Disc 1
"Who Am I (Tripitena's Song)" (Previously unreleased version) - 5:33
"Sweet Jane" – The Velvet Underground - 3:01
"Rock & Roll" – The Velvet Underground - 4:41
"I'm Waiting for the Man" – The Velvet Underground - 4:37
"White Light/White Heat" (Live) - 5:01
"Street Hassle; Waltzing Matilda / Street Hassle / Slipaway" - 11:00
"Berlin" - 3:23
"Caroline Says II" - 4:12
"The Kids" - 7:49
"Walk on the Wild Side" - 4:11
"Kill Your Sons" (Live) - 4:09
"Vicious" - 2:56
"The Blue Mask" - 5:01
"I'll Be Your Mirror" (Live) - 2:46
"Magic and Loss – The Summation" - 6:36
"Ecstasy" - 4:31

Disc 2
"I Wanna Be Black" (Live) - 6:30
"Temporary Thing" - 5:14
"Shooting Star" - 3:11
"Legendary Hearts" - 3:05
"Heroin" (Live) - 8:21
"Coney Island Baby" - 6:36
"The Last Shot" - 3:23
"The Bells" - 9:20
"Perfect Day" - 3:43
"Sally Can't Dance" - 2:55
"Satellite of Love" - 3:38
 "NYC Man" - 4:55
"Dirty Blvd." - 3:30
"Rock Minuet" - 6:56
"Pale Blue Eyes" – The Velvet Underground - 5:38

References

Lou Reed compilation albums
2003 compilation albums
Albums produced by Hal Willner